Yapraklı is a town in Çankırı Province in the Central Anatolia region of Turkey. It is the seat of Yapraklı District. Its population is 2,151 (2021). The town consists of 6 quarters: Aşağı, Camikebir, Yukarı, Akyazı, İğdir and Kavak.

References

External links
 Municipality's official website 

Populated places in Yapraklı District
Towns in Turkey